Osvaldo Elías Castro Hernández (born January 5, 1990), better known by the stage name Darell is a Puerto Rican rapper and songwriter specializing in reggaeton and Latin trap. Born in Puerto Rico, he moved to New York. He is signed to White Lion Records and Sony Music Latin.

Darell & Belto
He met Belto who was also interested in playing music and they formed a duo called Darell & Belto or Belto & Darell in 2010. Their first release was "Entrega a la maldad" followed the same year by "Sateo", "Si te dicen" in 2011 and "De Cali a Medellin" in 2012.

Solo career
Darell also has his own solo career. Very early on he appeared as a solo act in the 2011 album Parandoles La Movie by Pichy Boy & Skaary in the song "Bala" and collaborated in "No quiere compromiso" and "Inmortal", and in 2013 released his solo hit "Despedida de un hermano". In 2014, with La Pompa Music he released a number of hits like "La verdad" in 2014, "La calle esta mala" and "No digas na" in 2015. He continued with La Pompa Music in 2015 and 2016 with "To' el mundo carga un arma", "La noche es larga" and "Liberar el estrés" leaving the label in 2016.

In 2016, he released "Ninguno se monta" establishing himself as a reggaeton and Latin trap artist. His mixtape La Verdadera Vuelta in collaboration with Ñengo Flow, Anuel AA, Tempo, Tali and Lito Kirino was a major success.

He is most famous for the single "Te Boté" (English: "I Dumped You"), a song recorded with Puerto Rican rappers Nio García and Casper Mágico. The song was released by Flow La Movie Inc. as a single on December 1, 2017, for digital download and streaming. On April 13, 2018, a remixed version of the song featuring American artist Nicky Jam and Puerto Rican artists Bad Bunny and Ozuna was released as a single. An English remix of the song by Conor Maynard featuring Anth was released on May 19, 2018. The song ranked at number 1 on the Billboard Hot Latin Songs of Billboard. 

In 2018, he participated as a featured artist in Brytiago's hit "Asesina" which was positioned at #50 on Hot  Latin Songs. In 2019, he took part in the song "Otro trago" by Sech, that reached number 1 on the US Hot Latin Songs. It was nominated for the Latin Grammy Awards in Best Urban Fusion and Best Song of the Year categories. The song reached number one in Sech's native Panama, as well as in Spain, Argentina, Colombia, Peru, Paraguay, Honduras and Mexico. In the United States, the song peaked at number 34 on the Billboard Hot 100, making Sech's first entry as a solo artist on the chart. A remix featuring Nicky Jam, Ozuna, and Anuel AA was also released. 

Darell recorded "Vacía sin mí" in collaboration with Ozuna which was released in 2019. In 2020, Darell released his debut studio album LVV: The Real Rondon. Alternatively known as La Verdadera Vuelta 2, it has collaborations with Ñengo Flow, Miky Woodz, De La Ghetto, Kevvo, Gerardo Ortiz and others.

Discography

Studio albums

Mixtapes

Singles

As lead singer

As featured artist

Notes

References

Puerto Rican rappers
1990 births
Living people